Alexander Kotz (born 20 December), known professionally as Elderbrook, is an English musician, songwriter and producer. His career as a musician began in 2015, when he released his first EP, which contained the song, "How Many Times" which went on to be remixed by German duo Andhim, becoming one of Mixmags best songs of 2015.

During 2016, he collaborated with a number of artists, including Gorgon City. He also remixed tracks by a number of well-known artists, such as Clean Bandit.

To date, Elderbrook's most notable song is the collaboration with CamelPhat, titled "Cola". The song reached number one on both the Dance Club Songs chart in the United States and Indie Chart in the United Kingdom. It was also nominated for Best Dance song at the 2018 Grammy Awards.

Career
Elderbrook first ventured into music at the age of 16. He began playing as member of an indie band, before at nineteen switching to a singer-songwriter. During an interview with Red Bull, he stated it was a "folky acoustic thing" part of his career. He then attended university, where he says he was first exposed to quality electronic dance music and subsequently began listening to various dance genres.

Before moving into the electronic music genre, he wanted to pursue a more hip hop and soulful sound with his distinct vocals.

Kotz began to use the moniker Elderbrook after finishing university and debuted with the track and EP of the same name, Could. His debut extended play featured a number of tracks that went on to garner over a million views on SoundCloud and similar platforms. The EP featured three tracks, Could, Rewinding and How Many Times. All three tracks received positive reviews, with the latter becoming Elderbrook's first major hit.

Elderbrook first major inroads into the music industry when he collaborated with the German duo, Andhim. The track was a reworked version of the original How Many Times from Elderbrook's first EP. The track received positive reviews throughout the music industry. It was released in mid-2015, becoming a dance classic and pushing Elderbrook's name out into the wider dance music genre. Mixmag were one of the most complimentary of the collaboration, giving the track 8/10. It also went onto be listed as one of Mixmags top tracks for 2015.

Following the success of his first EP, he released a second in the same year. Travel Slow contained three tracks, "Be There Soon", "Good Enough" and "Travel Slow". While working on his first two EP's he also became heavily involved in remixing. He released a number of well-known remixes of songs which performed well on various Billboard charts. One of the most notable during 2015 was Pablo Nouvelle's "Take Me to a Place".

During 2016, Elderbrook toured and supported a number of well-known acts. One of the main acts he worked with during 2016, was Gorgon City. He was a supporting act for their performance at the Brixton Academy and also collaborated on their single, "Smile", which was released in October 2016. He also played at the Omeara in London to a sold-out crowd in November 2016.

Toward the end of 2016, it was announced that Elderbrook would be the official remixer of "Rockabye" by British band Clean Bandit.

In 2017, Elderbrook announced his first tour of the UK, where he sold out XOYO and Oval Space in London. Elderbrook shot to commercial fame when he collaborated with CamelPhat. The song they produced was titled "Cola", and went onto become one of the biggest selling song globally in 2017. It was co-written by British electronic house duo CamelPhat, with Elderbrook on vocals. The lyrics over the top of an electro house beat, follow a woman's night out, involving mixing various drinks involving Coca-Cola. The song performed well during the summer months as a club anthem in many places throughout Europe and the United States, before becoming a chart single later in the year.

The song received critical acclaim during November 2017, when it reached number one on the Billboard's Dance Club Songs chart when it entered the charts on 11 November 2017. The song also reached number one on the UK Indie chart during November 2017. It performed well on the UK singles chart, reaching the Top 20, in 18th position. "Cola" was subsequently nominated for a Best Dance Recording at the 2018 Grammy Awards.

The success of the track meant it was remixed by a number of well-known dance artists, including Robin Schulz. In the United Kingdom, the single went platinum in December 2017, when it sold 600,000 copies.

In February 2018, he announced he would be touring the United States.

Musical style
He is known for his versatility as a musician, as he is recognised as a multi-instrumentalist. He has taken influences from country and soul to rock and gospel, classically trained in both piano and guitar. His production techniques follow his ambition to "make some I haven't heard before". He has been known to sample unique sounds such as the breaking of reading glasses and crackling ice in a warm coffee. He also stated in an interview that he would "often bang the table I’m sat at, sample it and use that as my drums".

Following the release of his first single on the label Black Butter, Elderbrook's vocals were complimented by Mixmag, describing them as flawless. When speaking about his style of production, Elderbrook stated "phonetics are as important as lyrics. My voice adds another important harmonic element to the sounds." Red Bull stated that his sound and tracks regularly contained "tender vocals and ambient beats."

Discography

Studio albums

Extended plays
 Simmer Down (2015)
 Travel Slow (2015)
 Talking (2017)
 Old Friend (2018)
 Innerlight (2021)

Singles

Remixes
 Amber Run – "I Found" (2014)
 Pablo Nouvelle – "Take Me to a Place" (2015)
 Chloe Black – "27 Club" (2015)
 Alex Adair – "Heaven" (2015)
 Clean Bandit featuring Sean Paul – "Rockabye" (Elderbrook Remix) (2016)
 X Ambassadors – "Unsteady" (Elderbrook Remix) (2016)
 Klangkarussell – "Hey Maria" (2016)
 Big Wild – "Empty Room" (2017)

References

Musicians from London
Living people
Year of birth missing (living people)
Parlophone artists
English electronic musicians
English record producers